Kevin Brian Goldspink (born November 16, 1941) is an Australian former rugby league footballer who played in the 1960s and 1970s for Canterbury-Bankstown and Eastern Suburbs.

Playing career
Goldspink played for Canterbury-Bankstown at second-row forward in the 1967 NSWRFL season's premiership final loss against South Sydney.  He played with Canterbury-Bankstown for six seasons between 1963-1969. He was selected for the Kangaroo Tour in 1968 and played 13 matches on tour, but no tests.

He finished his career at Eastern Suburbs, playing two seasons between 1971-1972.

His son, Brett Goldspink, played rugby league for the Perth Reds, Canberra, Illawara, Oldham, St Helens, Halifax and Wigan.

References

Australian rugby league players
Canterbury-Bankstown Bulldogs players
Sydney Roosters players
Australia national rugby league team players
Living people
Rugby league second-rows
Rugby league locks
1941 births
Country New South Wales rugby league team players